The Ain Dara temple is an Iron Age Syro-Hittite temple noted for its similarities to Solomon's Temple, also known as the First Temple, as described in the Hebrew Bible. It is located near the village of Ain Dara, in Afrin, Syria. According to the excavator Ali Abu Assaf, it existed from 1300 BC until 740 BC and remained almost unchanged during the construction of Solomon's Temple (1000–900 BC) as it had been before, so that it predates the Temple. The temples of Emar, Mumbaqa, and Ebla (Temple D) are also comparable, as is the nearby 8th-century Tell Tayinat temple. The surviving sculptures depict lions and sphinxes (comparable to the cherubim of the First Temple).

Massive footprints were carved into the floor; whether of giants, humans or animals is debatable. Also left to speculation is to whom the temple is dedicated. Ain Dara may have been devoted to Ishtar, goddess of fertility, or to the related female goddess Astarte. It also might have been dedicated to the deity Ba'al Hadad; or it might have been an oracle temple on a road known as "the international highway" between the Syrian Desert and Mediterranean Sea.

According to the Assad government, In late January 2018, the temple was significantly damaged by Turkish Air Force jets in the course of their Afrin offensive. Reports indicate that at least 60% percent of the structure was reduced to rubble. Viewing photos and video released online, one can see that the entire front facade of the temple has been destroyed. The site's emblematic basalt lion was stolen in December 2019 by members of the al-Hamzat militia, a part of the Syrian National Army.

Geography
It was built on a terrace known as the "acropolis of the tell". The tell itself is precipitous-faced and overlooks the Afrin Valley.

Just east of the temple site is the modern-day village of Ain Dara.

History of excavation

The discovery of the temple was the result of a fortuitous finding of a colossal basalt lion in 1955. Excavations in 1956, 1962, and 1964 were conducted by Maurice Dunand and Feisal Seirafi; beginning in 1976, Ali Abu Assaf continued the work.

History of the tell and temple
The earliest habitation signs on the tell are from the Chalcolithic period during the fourth millennium BC, and the tell remained occupied until the Ottoman period (1517 -1917).

Ali Abu Assaf discovered the temple and inferred that it was built in three structural phases in the period from about 1300 BC to 740 BC. The first phase was from 1300 to 1000 BC, the second phase from 1000 to 900 BC, and third phase from 900 to 740 BC.

Architecture and fittings

General outline

The Ain Dara temple, as excavated, has revealed a three-part layout with structural blocks of basalt on limestone foundations. However, it has been conjectured that the temple probably had a mud-brick superstructure covered with wood paneling, which has not survived.

Exterior
A courtyard built with sandstones provides the approach to the temple. The courtyard is paved with flagstones where a chalkstone basin for ceremonial purposes is seen. The temple,  in size, faces southeast. Its exterior contains a cherubim relief. The entrance porch, or portico, marked by two basalt piers or pillars, and a wide hall, were not roofed over and were part of an open courtyard. The entrance pillars appear to have architectural and cultic significance. A sphinx and two lions decorate the temple portico flanking the three steps (out of four) made from basalt.

Interior

The main sections include the porch, a middle room and an inner room or sanctum. There are basalt reliefs in the lower wall panels. An elevated podium ( high platform), a niche, and a secondary wall are part of the visible remains. In the small shrine area situated at the innermost area of the temple, the wall has carved sockets and grooves, which point to the former presence of a wooden screen. A ramp joins the main room to the platform area and the sanctum. The back wall of the sanctum has a niche which probably housed a statue of a god or goddess. Paved floors and walls reliefs are visible in the multistoried hallways, at least three stories high, that flank three sides of the temple, with at least one southern entrance. Figure-eight lattice patterns are included on two false, recessed windows that were carved into the temple walls. While all these were dated as part of first and second phase creations, material remains unearthed at the site identify additions made in the third phase of construction, an "ambulatory with a series of side chambers on three sides of the temple". It has also been inferred that these chambers were part of the pre-existing temple platform and not linked to the main temple.

Footprints

It is also conjectured that these foot prints could be of unidentified "immense clawed creatures".
Monson has also noted that the deities in all the Ain Dara temple reliefs have "shoes with curled-up toes". Hence, the source of the footprints, whether of gods or humans or animals, is debatable.

Similarities with Solomon's Temple

After the 1980–1985 excavations, the similarities between the temple at Ain Dara with Solomon's Temple in Jerusalem, as described in the Biblical texts though not seen on ground, were discussed by archaeologists and historians.

There are many features in common with Solomon's Temple as described in the Book of Kings. The layout of Dara is similar to that of the Biblical temple, which was also of a long room plan with the three-room configuration of a portico at the entrance followed by the main chamber with the shrine. The difference is in the antechamber, which is an add-on in the Ain Dara temple. Other similarities include:  location on a high raised site overlooking a city; erected on a raised platform, with a narrow portico and a roof supported on pillars flanked by reliefs on the walls, and carvings of similar motifs; and the raised podium. In brief, 33 of the architectural elements found in Ain Dara are tallied with 65 of the features mentioned in the Biblical description of Solomon's Temple.

Destruction in 2018–2019

Destruction by Turkish military in 2018
In late January 2018, both the Syrian Directorate-General of Antiquities and Museums and pro-rebel Syrian Observatory for Human Rights reported major destruction of the temple following airstrikes by the Turkish Air Force in the course of their Afrin offensive. Aerial bombardments of the Ain Dara site were first reported by a local resident via Dutch news network NOS on 23 January 2018.

As reported on MSN news, with the headline "Blown to bits", it is clear the temple was heavily damaged. "For 3,000 years, the lion sculptures of Syria's Ain Dara stood as testaments to the Iron Age. But as Turkish bombardment pounds the region, they have little left but their paws."

As stated by the Directorate of Antiquities in Afrin on 31 January 2018:  "Turkish forces revealed the occupation of Syrian geography in its real face, especially the Turkish state, since the declaration of war on Afrin canton on 20 January 2018, as it escalated Operation Olive Branch to go beyond the targeting of military forces to include shelling villages and towns full of civilians from the elderly, children and women To the rich and varied history and civilization of the province from prehistoric times to the present day."

"On 27 January 2018, the Turkish state warplanes bombarded and damaged the ancient "Ein -Darat" temple, despite its distance from the fighting fronts and the areas of engagement, by about 20 kilometers. Accordingly, the Directorate of Antiquities in Afrin canton and all the bodies and councils associated with Democratic Autonomous Administration and civil institutions condemn this savage shelling of sites and archaeological sites that are the property of all mankind. We call on the international community and all organizations involved in this field to intervene immediately, seriously and Turkish Cultural and Human Heritage in Afrin canton".
The Directorate-General of Antiquities and Museums and Syrian Ministry of Culture issued a statement condemning the attack on the site as "aggression of the Turkish regime on archaeological sites in the northern countryside of Aleppo" and called on international organizations to denounce the attack on Ain Dara.

Basalt lion stolen by Turkish-backed group
In early December 2019, Al-Hamzat backed by Turkish forces, took part in Operation Peace Spring, journeying out to eventually plunder the already Turkish-bombed disaster area of 'Ain Dara's archaeological site. It was reported across multiple news outlets including the Syrian information news network of SANA, that this group also carried out illegal excavations in the areas of Afrin and looted facilities near Ras al-Ayn in the Al-Hasakah region of Northeast Syria. 

The basalt lion sculpture, which was discovered in 1956, like the Ain Dara temple itself, is now gone:"On December 20th [2019], the Turkish army and its mercenaries attacked Afrin with tanks, artillery and jets causing massive destruction of the city....Recent footage of a military exercise by a pro-Turkish militia (National Liberation Front) who established a shooting range against the archaeological hill of Ain Dara in the occupied Afrin province invaded and controlled by Turkish forces and their proxy militias last year, revealed the tragic disappearance of the famous historical masterpiece known as The Lion of Afrin. Ain Dara itself was targeted by Turkish jets in 2018 as Turkish units and their proxy forces advanced on the area known for its archaeological wealth that featured one of the world's oldest temples often compared in significance to the Temple of Solomon... The disappearance of the Lion of Afrin marks another war crime against Syrian history and humanity at large."

Warnings gone by as careless and/or deliberate destruction continues
U.N. organizations and human rights groups have heavily warned since February 2019 that Turkish backed rebel forces were carrying out systematic violent and deadly attacks against Kurdish civilians in Afrin. “The commission finds there are reasonable grounds to believe that armed group members in Afrin committed the war crimes of hostage-taking, cruel treatment, torture, and pillage,” the United Nations report said.

The end of Ain Dara and the ancient basalt lion
After months of warnings, on 17 December 2019, the Prensa Latina news source detailed the looting of Ain Dara, reporting: "...these elements carried out illegal excavations in areas of the town of Afrin, in the north of Aleppo and looted properties and facilities in the village of Tal Mohammed and near that of Ras Al Ayn, in that of Hasaka.   Various sources also indicated that in the village of Joga, near the aforementioned Afrin, terrorists of the Al Hamzat organization seized a Basalt Lion at the Archaeological site of Ain Dara"...There are many tell [archaeological mound] sites in the surrounding area, such as Tall Sulaymānī, which in Arabic means "Tell of Solomon". Furthermore, to the east also is Qamishli, the second largest city in the al-Hasakah Governorate, which was home to a significant Jewish community in ancient times. It was also the modern center of Syriac Christianity, formed after the 1915 Assyrian Genocide, which followed the Armenian and Greek genocides perpetrated against the Syrian Christians during WWI. An estimated 20,000 Christians left the city of Qamishli after the 2011 Syrian War erupted. Qamishli is situated at the base of the Taurus Mountains, located near the area of ancient Hurrian city of Urkesh, which was founded during the 3000 BC era. Excavations have been on hold during the Syrian War since 2011, but unlike Ain Dara, the Urkesh site is protected by Kurdish YPG troops since 2016. Additionally, in the town of Urkesh, the copper Louvre lion and accompanying stone tablet bearing the earliest known text in Hurrian was discovered, dating to the Akkadian period of 2300 – 2159 BC. A second, copper lion found there, is on permanent exhibit in the Metropolitan Museum of Art.

References

External links

  Special Report: Current Status of the Tell Ain Dara Temple, ASOR Cultural Heritage Initiatives (CHI): Safeguarding the Heritage of the Near East Initiative, March 2018. Via Bible History Daily, accessed 9 January 2020. With description of the temple, damage assessment, before-and-after photos.
Pictures from 2010
Photos of Ain Dara at the American Center of Research

14th-century BC religious buildings and structures
Iron Age sites in Syria
Buildings and structures in Aleppo Governorate
Archaeological sites in Aleppo Governorate
2nd-millennium BC establishments
1980s archaeological discoveries
Aramean states
Afrin District
Destroyed temples
Inanna
Baal